Carolina Charlotta Mariana von Düben, commonly known as Lotten von Düben (née von Bahr; November 23, 1828 – December 25, 1915) was an early Swedish amateur photographer and a pioneering reportage and documentary photographer.

Her work constitute an important chapter in the history of Swedish photography. She is most notably remembered for her images of the Sami people.

Early life 
Born on 23 November 1828, the third of six children, in Söderby in Uppland to the noble von Bahr family; her father was the major Robert von Bahr and Baroness Eva Carolina Åkerhielm af Margretelund, both from aristocrat families. She grew up at both Söderby and Margretelund.

Work 
In 1868, her husband, Gustaf von Düben, began to compile a catalogue of Lapp skulls. It was illustrated with photographs taken by Lotten von Düben, probably based on the approach adopted by Carl Curman who had a photographic studio in the building where the couple lived.

Von Düben also took many landscape photographs of the Swedish mountains and waterfalls during her trips to Lapland. Unlike her contemporaries, she photographed the scenery to provide a record for herself rather than to sell the images. Taken in the open air rather than in a studio, her portraits show the Sami in their natural environment. Together with the work of Bertha Valerius and Rosalie Sjöman, von Düben's photographs constitute an important chapter in the history of Swedish photography.

Expedition to Lapland 
On 3 July 1868, the von Dübens left Stockholm by ship on the first expedition to Lapland, along with the assistant G. H. Santesson and the cook Johanna Björklund, undertaking a study of the Sami people. They took with them all the heavy photographic equipment they needed to produce iodinated collodion negatives. Using a stereo camera, Lotten von Dühen photographed the Samis first from the front, then in profile. In 1871, they returned to the area, this time with two cameras. To document their findings, in 1873 Gustaf von Düben published Om Lappland och Lapparne, företrädesvis de Svenske: Ethnografiska Studier af Gustaf von Düben which was illustrated with his wife's photographs.

Personal life 
In 1857, she married Baron Gustaf von Düben, a member of the Düben family, and a doctor of medicine and professor of pathological anatomy at the Karolinska Institute in Stockholm.

Von Düben died at Nysund on 25 December 1915.

Gallery of photographs
The photographs below are all portraits of Sami people taken by Lotten von Düden:

See also 

 Düben family
 History of photography
 Sámi history

References

Works cited

Further reading
 

1828 births
1915 deaths
19th-century Swedish photographers
Swedish women photographers
People from Upplands Väsby Municipality
19th-century women photographers
Lotten
Swedish baronesses
People in Sámi history